Ozodicera is a genus of true crane fly.

Species
 Subgenus Dihexaclonus Enderlein, 1912
O. apicalis Macquart, 1838
O. biaculeata Alexander, 1954
O. effecta Alexander, 1944
O. fumipennis Loew, 1851
O. gracilirama Alexander, 1941
O. guianensis Alexander, 1934
O. jesseana Alexander, 1945
O. lanei Alexander, 1942
O. longisector Alexander, 1944
O. macracantha Alexander, 1940
O. neivai Alexander, 1940
O. panamensis Alexander, 1922
O. perfuga Alexander, 1944
O. pumila Alexander, 1942
O. spilophaea Alexander, 1942
O. superarmata Alexander, 1942
O. telestyla Alexander, 1969
O. terrifica Alexander, 1942
O. triguttata Alexander, 1921
O. tripallens Alexander, 1942
O. umbrifera Alexander, 1937
O. xanthostoma Loew, 1851
 Subgenus Ozodicera Macquart, 1834
O. attenuata Alexander, 1920
O. bimaculata Enderlein, 1912
O. bispinifer Alexander, 1921
O. carrerella Alexander, 1956
O. caudifera Alexander, 1945
O. cinereipennis Alexander, 1937
O. corrientesana Alexander, 1962
O. cygniformis Alexander, 1953
O. duidensis AIexander, 1931
O. eliana Alexander, 1954
O. epicosma Alexander, 1926
O. eurystyla Alexander, 1954
O. extensa Alexander, 1921
O. gracilis (Westwood, 1835)
O. griseipennis Loew, 1851
O. idiostyla Alexander, 1980
O. longimana (Fabricius, 1805)
O. multiermis Alexander, 1942
O. nigromarginata Alexander, 1938
O. noctivagans Alexander, 1914
O. pectinata (Wiedemann, 1828)
O. phallacantha Alexander, 1942
O. piatrix Alexander, 1944
O. placata Alexander, 1966
O. schwarzmaierana Alexander, 1942
O. septemtrionis Alexander, 1940
O. simplex (Walker, 1856)
O. striatipennis Alexander, 1941
O. strohmi Alexander, 1945
O. subvittata Alexander, 1938
O. thaumasta Alexander, 1954
O. trispinifer Alexander, 1940
O. witteana Alexander, 1942
O. zikaniana Alexander, 1937

References

Tipulidae
Taxa named by Pierre-Justin-Marie Macquart